This list of Nepenthes literature is a listing of major published works dealing with the tropical pitcher plants of the genus Nepenthes. It includes specialised standalone publications and taxonomic monographs released as part of larger works, but excludes regular journal and magazine articles.

Unless otherwise indicated, all information on individual publications is sourced from them directly. Works are listed chronologically by year of first publication.


Standalone publications
This list includes all works published as standalone books or booklets, with the exception of children's literature, which is listed separately below.

Monographs published as part of larger works

This list includes major monographs that were not released as standalone publications. In the case of journal articles and papers, the parent publication is indicated in brackets.

Only the primary prosaic language is listed for each publication, although many of the earlier monographs also include substantial portions of Latin text in the form of taxon descriptions. Some of the taxa formally described in these monographs are not considered taxonomically valid today.

Children's literature

Notes

a.Year 2552 in the Thai solar calendar.

References

External links
 Ivo's Book List at The Carnivorous Plant FAQ (updated list)

 *
Nepenthes literature